Jean Hébert (born November 11, 1957 in Quebec City, Quebec) is a Canadian chess player, writer, journalist, and commentator who holds the ICCF title of Correspondence Chess Grandmaster and the FIDE title of International Master. He is the 2009 Canadian chess champion, a title he first won in 1978. He tied for this title in 2007 as well, but lost in playoffs. He represented Canada at the 1979 Interzonal tournament, as well as seven times in chess Olympiads. He took part in the Chess World Cup 2009 and was knocked out by Peter Svidler in the first round.

Early years 
Jean Hébert made his first significant mark in chess when as a fifteen-year-old first category player, he won the 1973 Carnaval Open at Quebec City, ahead of several experienced masters. He represented Canada at the 1974 World Under-17 Championship, won the Junior Canadian Chess Championship at Saint John in 1975-76, and represented Canada at the World Junior Chess Championship, Groningen 1976-77, making an even score of 6.5/13.

Canadian champion 
Hébert played in his first Zonal Canadian Chess Championship at Calgary 1975, placing 11th with 5.5/15; the winner was Peter Biyiasas. At his next attempt, Hebert won the 1978 Zonal at Toronto with 11/15, just ahead of Biyiasas. For scoring two-thirds of the possible points, he was automatically awarded the International Master title, and as winner of the event, qualified for the Interzonal tournament the next year. The Interzonal at Rio de Janeiro was his first top-class international event, and Hébert finished with 4.5/17, thus sharing last place, with the title won by Robert Hübner, Lajos Portisch, and Tigran Petrosian. In his Canadian Zonal title defence at Montreal 1981, Hébert scored 10.5/15, but could only tie for 2nd-3rd, behind winner Igor V. Ivanov. In 2009, 31 years after his first canadian championship, Hébert did it again, this time in Guelph, Ontario. His 7.5/9 was good for 1st, a full point in front of his pursuers.

At the Olympiads 

Hébert has represented Canada a total of seven times at Chess Olympiads from 1978–2002. His first two appearances, in 1978 and 1980, saw Canada score its highest team placings ever, with eleventh and ninth-place finishes, respectively. In 72 games, he has scored (+25 =25 -22), for 52.1 per cent. Here are his detailed Olympiad results.

 Buenos Aires 1978, board 1, 4/11 (+2 =4 -5);
 Valletta 1980, board 1, 7/12 (+4 =6 -2);
 Merano 1982, board 3, 8.5/12 (+7 =3 -2), board bronze medal;
 Thessaloniki 1984, board 2, 6.5/12 (+5 =3 -4);
 Novi Sad 1990, board 2, 2.5/7 (+2 =1 -4);
 Yerevan 1996, board 3, 7/12 (+4 =6 -2);
 Bled 2002, 2nd reserve, 2/6 (+1 =2 -3).

Correspondence chess Grandmaster 
Hébert has also excelled at correspondence chess. He placed second in the 1976 Canadian Correspondence Championship, and was a member of the bronze-medal winning Canadian team in the 11th ICCF Olympiad. Hébert was awarded the title of International Grandmaster of Correspondence Chess by ICCF in 1984.

Quebec successes 
Hébert has enjoyed considerable success in Quebec provincial championships, at both the Open and Closed levels, as well as in other home-based events. He won the 1980 Montreal Invitational with 6/8, and drew an exhibition match 2-2 with Kevin Spraggett that year. Hébert faced Spraggett again in a playoff match in 1982, after the two had tied for 2nd-3rd places in the 1981 Zonal, for a reserve place in the Interzonal. This time Spraggett prevailed by 3.5-0.5. Hébert shared 2nd-3rd places in the Quebec Closed at Montreal 1983 with 6/9, behind Spraggett. He shared 1st-2nd places in the 1985 Quebec Closed on 8.5/11 with George Levtchouk. Hébert placed tied 3rd-4th in the 1985 Canadian Chess Championship with 6.5/9, as Ivanov and Sylvain Barbeau shared the top spots. He finished 2nd in the Quebec Closed 1988 with 8.5/11 behind Ivanov. Hébert won the 1990 Quebec Closed with 7.5/9.

He shared first in the 2002 Canadian Open Chess Championship at Montreal, with 8/10. 
Hébert has won the Quebec Open Chess Championship five times (1989, 1990, 1994, 2002, 2005), and this ties the record for the most titles in that event.

Legacy and writings 
Hébert is the first Canadian Francophone chess player to establish a solid international reputation, by playing in the 1979 Interzonal, and with his seven chess Olympiad appearances, earning a bronze medal in 1982. He was the first Francophone Canadian Chess Championship winner since 1884, and only the second ever. He is also the first Canadian Francophone to earn the correspondence Grandmaster title, and is one of the few players to achieve international titles at both over-the-board and correspondence chess. His writings have included these works:

 Karpov -- Korchnoi 1978 (in French);
 Border Wars III;
 Leçons d'échecs du Tournoi International de Montréal 2001 (Chess'n Math Association in French);
 Le Livre du Tournoi International de Montréal 2002 (Chess'n Math Association in French);
 Modern Benoni CD ChessBase.

Hébert has been a respected commentator at major chess matches and events, such as the 1989 Quebec City Candidates' encounter between Kevin Spraggett and Artur Yusupov. He served as Editor for the magazine Echecs+, published by the Quebec Chess Federation. He was the chess columnist for La Presse (Canada), has written articles for New In Chess, and published the magazine Au Nom du Roi, which has since been replaced by his own online newsletter. He served for a time as a columnist and games analyst with Chess Canada magazine. Hébert was inducted into the Canadian Chess Hall of Fame in 2001.

After reaching the Canadian title at age 20 in 1978, Hébert, in spite of his own significant improvement after that time, was surpassed in Canadian chess by 1980 Soviet defector Igor V. Ivanov, and also by Kevin Spraggett, over whom he had at first had the edge.

Competitive resurgence 
Hébert has scaled back his top-class play in recent years, but still competes in a few events each year, and showed, at the age of nearly fifty, that he remained a competitive force with his first-place tie in the 2007 Canadian Championship at Kitchener, Ontario. He surpassed that performance in August, 2009 at Guelph, Ontario, when he won the 2009 Canadian Chess Championship with a score of 7.5/9, a full point ahead of runner-up Grandmaster Mark Bluvshtein; this victory made him, at the age of nearly fifty-two, the oldest Canadian champion ever.

Also in 2009, he won the Quebec Closed (January) and the Montreal Open (September).

References

External links

 
  (archive)
 
 Canadian Chess Hall of Fame Inductee 2001 

1957 births
Living people
Canadian chess players
Canadian chess writers
Canadian non-fiction writers
Canadian writers in French
Chess International Masters
Correspondence chess grandmasters
French Quebecers
Sportspeople from Montreal
Sportspeople from Quebec City
Writers from Montreal
Writers from Quebec City